Kojima may refer to:

Surname 
 Kojima (surname)

Places
 Kōjima, an island known for wild monkeys in Miyazaki Prefecture, Japan
 Kojima, an uninhabited island belonging to the Tokara Islands, in the southern part of Kagoshima Prefecture, Japan
 Kojima, an alternative spelling of Kutsujima island off Kyoto coast
 Kojima (Hokkaido), an uninhabited island of Oshima subprefecture of Hokkaidō in the Sea of Japan
 Kojima District, Okayama

Companies
 Kojima Productions, a prominent Japanese video game development studio
 Kojima Engineering, a Japanese Formula One constructor

Astronomy
 70P/Kojima, a periodic comet with a period of 7 years